Rear-Admiral Sir Oswald Nigel Amherst Cecil, KBE, CB (11 November 1925 – 10 March 2017) was a British naval officer.

Early life
Oswald Nigel Amherst Cecil was born 11 November 1925 to Commander Hon. Henry Mitford Amherst Cecil (1893–1963) and Hon. Yvonne Cornwallis (1896–1983).  Cecil is a paternal grandson of Lord William Cecil (1854–1943) and the 2nd Baroness Amherst of Hackney (1857–1919) and a maternal grandson of the 1st Baron Cornwallis (1864–1935). He was educated at Ludgrove School and the Royal Naval College, Dartmouth.

Naval career
In 1959, he reached the rank of Commander. From 1961–63, Cecil commanded HMS Corunna in the Mediterranean and then HMS Royal Arthur from 1963–65. In 1966, he was promoted to the rank of Captain.

He returned to Dartmouth to command a training squadron from 1969–71. In 1968 he was made an Esquire (Esq.St.J. the lowest grade) in the Venerable Order of Saint John.

Cecil received the acting rank of Commodore in 1971 and was sent to South Africa as a Naval attaché to Cape Town until 1973. He was then a director of the Naval Operational Requirements from 1973–75. On 7 January 1975, he was appointed a Naval aide-de-camp to The Queen. He left this position on being promoted to Rear Admiral on 7 July 1975. He then became the NATO Commander of the South East Mediterranean and Flag Officer, Malta. In the 1978 New Year Honours, he was made a Companion of the Order of the Bath (CB).

Cecil left the island with the last of the British Forces in 1979 and on, 16 June 1979, was made a Knight Commander of the Order of the British Empire (KBE). He retired from the navy on 15 September 1979.

On 9 September 1980, Cecil became Lieutenant Governor of the Isle of Man, a post he held for five years. Also in 1980, he was promoted to Knight of the Order of Saint John (K.St.J.).

Personal life
On 6 April 1961, he married Annette Barclay (b. 1934), daughter of Major Robert Edward Barclay of Mathers and Urie (1906–1959) and Nesta Anne Bury-Barry (1909–2004). Together they had:
Robert Barclay Amherst Cecil (b. 1965), who married Laurie A. Kohan

Cecil, who lived with his wife of over fifty-five years, on the Isle of Wight, died on 10 March 2017, aged 91.

References

|-

 

1925 births
2017 deaths
People educated at Ludgrove School
Graduates of Britannia Royal Naval College
Royal Navy rear admirals
Companions of the Order of the Bath
Knights Commander of the Order of the British Empire
Esquires of the Order of St John
Lieutenant Governors of the Isle of Man
Nigel Cecil